Marat Safin was the defending champion and won in the final 3–6, 6–3, 6–3 against Rainer Schüttler.

Seeds

  Juan Carlos Ferrero (first round)
  Yevgeny Kafelnikov (semifinals)
  Marat Safin (champion)
  Tommy Haas (first round)
  Goran Ivanišević (quarterfinals)
  Fabrice Santoro (quarterfinals)
  Greg Rusedski (second round)
  Nicolas Escudé (first round)

Draw

Finals

Top half

Bottom half

References
 2001 St. Petersburg Open Draw

St. Petersburg Open
2001 ATP Tour
2001 in Russian tennis